"Golden Guitar" is a song written by Billy Gray and Curtis Leach. It was first recorded by American country singer-songwriter Bill Anderson. It was released as a single in 1965 via Decca Records and became a major hit.

Background and release
"Golden Guitar" was recorded on September 9, 1965, at the Bradley Studio, located in Nashville, Tennessee. The sessions were produced by Owen Bradley, who would serve as Anderson's producer through most of years with Decca Records. Additional tracks were recorded at the session as well.

"Golden Guitar" was released as the B-side to Anderson's major hit "I Love You Drops." It was issued by Decca Records in December 1965. The song spent 13 weeks on the Billboard Hot Country Singles before reaching number 11 in April 1966. It was later released on his 1965 studio album Bright Lights and Country Music.

Track listings
7" vinyl single
 "I Love You Drops" – 2:45
 "Golden Guitar" – 4:13

Chart performance

References

1965 singles
1965 songs
Bill Anderson (singer) songs
Decca Records singles
Song recordings produced by Owen Bradley